Marcel Godard (9 April 1888 – 9 September 1966) was a French racing cyclist. He rode in the 1920 Tour de France.

References

1888 births
1966 deaths
French male cyclists
Place of birth missing